This is a list of reptiles of Sudan in alphabetical order by scientific name.
 Acanthocercus atricollis (Smith, 1849)
 Acanthodactylus boskianus (Daudin, 1802)
 Acanthodactylus guineensis (Boulenger, 1887)
 Acanthodactylus scutellatus (Audouin, 1827)
 Adolfus africanus (Boulenger, 1906)
 Afroablepharus wilsoni (Werner, 1914)
 Afrotyphlops brevis (Scortecci, 1929)
 Afrotyphlops lineolatus (Jan, 1864)
 Afrotyphlops punctatus (Leach, 1819)
 Afrotyphlops schlegelii (Bianconi, 1847)
 Agama doriae Boulenger, 1885
 Agama hartmanni Peters, 1869
 Agama rueppelli Vaillant, 1882
 Agama spinosa Gray, 1831
 Aparallactus jacksonii (Günther, 1888)
 Atractaspis irregularis (Reinhardt, 1843)
 Atractaspis magrettii Scortecci, 1928
 Atractaspis phillipsi Barbour, 1913
 Bitis arietans Merrem, 1820
 Bitis gabonica Duméril, Bibron & Duméril, 1854
 Bitis nasicornis (Shaw, 1802)
 Broadleysaurus major (Duméril, 1851)
 Caretta caretta (Linnaeus, 1758)
 Causus maculatus (Hallowell, 1842)
 Causus resimus (Peters, 1862)
 Causus rhombeatus (Lichtenstein, 1823)
 Centrochelys sulcata (Miller, 1779)
 Cerastes cerastes Linnaeus, 1758
 Cerastes vipera Linnaeus, 1758
 Chalcides bottegi Boulenger, 1898
 Chalcides ocellatus (Forskal, 1775)
 Chalcides ragazzii Boulenger, 1890
 Chamaeleo africanus Laurenti, 1768
 Chamaeleo gracilis Hallowell, 1844
 Chamaeleo laevigatus Gray, 1863
 Chelonia mydas (Linnaeus, 1758)
 Chilorhinophis butleri Werner, 1907
 Cnemaspis dickersonae (Schmidt, 1919)
 Crocodylus niloticus Laurenti, 1768
 Crotaphopeltis degeni (Boulenger, 1906)
 Cyclanorbis elegans (Gray, 1869)
 Cyclanorbis senegalensis (Duméril & Bibron, 1835)
 Cyrtopodion scabrum (Heyden, 1827)
 Dasypeltis atra Sternfeld, 1912
 Dasypeltis scabra (Linnaeus, 1758)
 Dendroaspis jamesoni (Traill, 1843)
 Dipsadoboa weileri (Lindholm, 1905)
 Echis pyramidum (Geoffroy Saint-Hilaire, 1827)
 Eirenis africanus (Boulenger, 1914)
 Elapsoidea laticincta (Werner, 1919)
 Elapsoidea loveridgei Parker, 1949
 Elapsoidea semiannulata Bocage, 1882
 Eretmochelys imbricata (Linnaeus, 1766)
 Eryx colubrinus (Linnaeus, 1758)
 Eryx muelleri (Boulenger, 1892)
 Gerrhosaurus flavigularis Wiegmann, 1828
 Gonionotophis capensis (Smith, 1847)
 Gonionotophis savorgnani (Mocquard, 1887)
 Grayia smithii (Leach, 1818)
 Grayia tholloni Mocquard, 1897
 Heliobolus spekii (Günther, 1872)
 Hemidactylus angulatus Hallowell, 1854
 Hemidactylus brookii Gray, 1845
 Hemidactylus flaviviridis Rüppell, 1835
 Hemidactylus foudaii Baha El Din, 2003
 Hemidactylus isolepis Boulenger, 1895
 Hemidactylus robustus Heyden, 1827
 Hemidactylus sinaitus Boulenger, 1885
 Hemidactylus squamulatus Tornier, 1896
 Hemidactylus turcicus (Linnaeus, 1758)
 Hemirhagerrhis hildebrandtii (Peters, 1878)
 Hemirhagerrhis kelleri Boettger, 1893
 Hemirhagerrhis nototaenia (Günther, 1864)
 Heremites auratus (Linnaeus, 1758)
 Kinixys belliana Gray, 1831
 Latastia longicaudata (Reuss, 1834)
 Leptosiaphos aloysiisabaudiae (Peracca, 1907)
 Leptotyphlops emini (Boulenger, 1890)
 Letheobia pallida Cope, 1868
 Letheobia sudanensis (Schmidt, 1923)
 Letheobia toritensis Broadley & Wallach, 2007
 Lycophidion capense (Smith, 1831)
 Lycophidion depressirostre Laurent, 1968
 Lycophidion ornatum Parker, 1936
 Lygodactylus gutturalis (Bocage, 1873)
 Lygodactylus picturatus (Peters, 1870)
 Malpolon insignitus (Geoffroy Saint-Hilaire, 1827)
 Malpolon moilensis (Reuss, 1834)
 Malpolon monspessulanus (Hermann, 1804)
 Meizodon semiornatus (Peters, 1854)
 Mesalina guttulata (Lichtenstein, 1823)
 Mesalina martini (Boulenger, 1897)
 Mesalina rubropunctata (Lichtenstein, 1823)
 Micrelaps vaillanti (Mocquard, 1888)
 Mochlus afer (Peters, 1854)
 Mochlus mocquardi (Chabanaud, 1917)
 Mochlus sundevalli (Smith, 1849)
 Myriopholis braccianii (Scortecci, 1929)
 Myriopholis cairi (Duméril & Bibron, 1844)
 Myriopholis macrorhyncha (Jan, 1860)
 Naja haje (Linnaeus, 1758)
 Naja melanoleuca Hallowell, 1857
 Naja nigricollis Reinhardt, 1843
 Naja nubiae Wüster & Broadley, 2003
 Naja pallida Boulenger, 1896
 Natriciteres olivacea (Peters, 1854)
 Ophisops elbaensis Schmidt & Marx, 1957
 Pelomedusa schweinfurthi Petzold, Vargas-Ramírez, Kehlmaier, Vamberger, Branch, Du Preez, Hofmeyr, Meyer, Schleicher, Široký & Fritz, 2014
 Pelusios adansonii (Schweigger, 1812)
 Philochortus intermedius Boulenger, 1917
 Philothamnus angolensis Bocage, 1882
 Philothamnus battersbyi Loveridge, 1951
 Philothamnus bequaerti (Schmidt, 1923)
 Philothamnus heterolepidotus (Günther, 1863)
 Philothamnus irregularis (Leach, 1819)
 Philothamnus semivariegatus (Smith, 1840)
 Platyceps florulentus (Geoffroy Saint-Hilaire, 1827)
 Platyceps rhodorachis (Jan, 1865)
 Platyceps tessellata (Werner, 1910)
 Pristurus flavipunctatus Rüppell, 1835
 Pristurus rupestris Blanford, 1874
 Prosymna ambigua Bocage, 1873
 Prosymna greigerti Mocquard, 1906
 Psammophis biseriatus Peters, 1881
 Psammophis lineatus (Duméril, Bibron & Duméril, 1854)
 Psammophis orientalis Broadley, 1977
 Psammophis punctulatus Duméril & Bibron, 1854
 Psammophis schokari (Forskal, 1775)
 Psammophis sibilans (Linnaeus, 1758)
 Psammophis subtaeniatus Peters, 1882
 Psammophis sudanensis Werner, 1919
 Psammophis tanganicus Loveridge, 1940
 Pseuderemias brenneri (Peters, 1869)
 Pseuderemias mucronata (Blanford, 1870)
 Pseudotrapelus chlodnickii Melnikov, Śmiełowski, Melnikova, Nazarov & Ananjeva, 2015
 Pseudotrapelus sinaitus (Heyden, 1827)
 Ptyodactylus hasselquistii (Donndorff, 1798)
 Ptyodactylus ragazzii Anderson, 1898
 Python regius (Shaw, 1802)
 Python sebae (Gmelin, 1789)
 Rhamphiophis oxyrhynchus (Reinhardt, 1843)
 Rhamphiophis rostratus Peters, 1854
 Rhamphiophis rubropunctatus (Fischer, 1884)
 Scaphiophis albopunctatus Peters, 1870
 Scaphiophis raffreyi Bocourt, 1875
 Scincopus fasciatus (Peters, 1864)
 Scincus scincus (Linnaeus, 1758)
 Spalerosophis diadema (Schlegel, 1837)
 Stenodactylus petrii Anderson, 1896
 Stenodactylus sthenodactylus (Lichtenstein, 1823)
 Stigmochelys pardalis (Bell, 1828)
 Tarentola annularis (Geoffroy Saint-Hilaire, 1827)
 Tarentola ephippiata O'Shaughnessy, 1875
 Telescopus dhara (Forskal, 1775)
 Telescopus gezirae Broadley, 1994
 Telescopus obtusus (Reuss, 1834)
 Toxicodryas blandingii (Hallowell, 1844)
 Trachylepis brevicollis (Wiegmann, 1837)
 Trachylepis buettneri (Matschie, 1893)
 Trachylepis maculilabris (Gray, 1845)
 Trachylepis megalura (Peters, 1878)
 Trachylepis perrotetii (Duméril & Bibron, 1839)
 Trachylepis quinquetaeniata (Lichtenstein, 1823)
 Trachylepis striata (Peters, 1844)
 Trachylepis varia (Peters, 1867)
 Trachylepis wingati (Werner, 1908)
 Trapelus mutabilis (Merrem, 1820)
 Tricheilostoma dissimilis (Bocage, 1886)
 Trioceros bitaeniatus (Fischer, 1884)
 Trioceros conirostratus (Tilbury, 1998)
 Trioceros ellioti (Günther, 1895)
 Trioceros kinetensis (Schmidt, 1943)
 Trioceros rudis (Boulenger, 1906)
 Trionyx triunguis (Forskål, 1775)
 Tropiocolotes bisharicus Baha El Din, 2001
 Tropiocolotes nubicus Baha El Din, 1999
 Tropiocolotes steudneri (Peters, 1869)
 Tropiocolotes tripolitanus Peters, 1880
 Uromastyx acanthinura Bell, 1825
 Uromastyx dispar Heyden, 1827
 Uromastyx ocellata Lichtenstein, 1823
 Varanus exanthematicus (Bosc, 1792)
 Varanus griseus (Daudin, 1803)
 Varanus niloticus (Linnaeus, 1766)

References

Sudan
Reptiles
Reptiles
Sudan